The Real Maestranza de Caballería de Valencia (Royal Cavalry Armory of Valencia) is a Spanish maestranza de caballería created in 1697. The first set of bylaws were approved seven years later, and currently the organization is governed by the latest draft of 1999. It has as its patron saint the Virgin Mary of the Immaculate Conception. Since the Real Cédula of 1760, it has enjoyed the same privileges as its sisters in Granada and Sevilla.

External links

 Real Maestranza de Caballería de Valencia
 Real Maestranza de Caballería de Ronda
 Real Maestranza de Caballería de Sevilla
 Real Maestranza de Caballería de Zaragoza

Social history of Spain
History of the Valencian Community
Organisations based in Spain with royal patronage